Naugatuck (formerly known as Mouth of Pigeon) is an unincorporated community in Mingo County, West Virginia, United States. Naugatuck has a post office with ZIP code 25685. The community was established in 1892.

References

Unincorporated communities in Mingo County, West Virginia
Unincorporated communities in West Virginia
Coal towns in West Virginia